Epipactis microphylla, the small-leaved helleborine, is a species of orchid. It is native to much of Europe and to Southwest Asia as far east as Iran though noticeably absent from the British Isles and from Scandinavia. It has also been found in North Africa, in the Babor mountains in Little Kabylia, Algeria.

References

External links 
Czech Botany (in English), Epipactis microphylla (Ehrh.) Sw. – Small-leaved Helleborine
Tela Botanica, Épipactis à petites feuilles, Epipactis microphylla Swartz
Rogier Van Vugt photo gallery, Orchids of Anatalya, Turkey, Epipactis microphylla
Orchideen in Baden-Württemberg, Epipactis microphylla (Ehrh.) Sw., Kleinblütige Stendelwurz
Orchids of Cyprus, Epipactis microphylla Πολύ σπάνιο είδος με περιορισμένη εξάπλωση. Ανθοφορία κατά τον μήνα Ιούνιο.

microphylla
Orchids of Europe